Sehikhpura Kothi, currently leased and operated as WelcomHeritage Sheikhpura Kothi, is a heritage building. It was built in 1924 by American architect Dinkelberg for the family of Sir Chhaju Ram Lamba the Jat Zamindar and businessman from Alakhpura, and later leased it to WelcomHeritage Hotels for its current operation as a heritage hotel.

It was ranked as the 2nd best hotel in Hisar by TripAdvisor in 2012.

History
It was built in 1924 by American architect Dinkelberg for the family of Sir Chhaju Ram Lamba the Jat Zamindar and businessman from Alakhpura. It was later leased it to WelcomHeritage Hotels for its current operation as a heritage hotel.

Facilities
The hotel has seven rooms and suites, a common room, restaurant, and conference room, and open air gathering for over a thousand people. It arranges excursions to nearby places of interest.

Recognition
 2nd Best Hotel in Hisar by TripAdvisor (2012)

References

External links
 Google map of Delhi to Sheikhupura Kothi

Museums in Haryana
Buildings and structures in Hisar district
Hotels in India